Valentin Stefanoff, (born 1959, Sofia, Bulgaria) is a French-Bulgarian artist. He has lives and works in France.

Biography 
Valentin Stefanoff was born in Sofia, Bulgaria. He studied at the Sofia Art School and subsequently at the National Academy of Fine Arts Sofia where he graduated in 1985. His works cover the fields of photography, drawing, printmaking, painting, objects, video and video installations.

Between the late 1980s and the early 1990s, Stefanoff focused on printmaking. With his first participation in The International Print Biennial Varna, he was awarded the First Prize. After 1995, Stefanoff's focus shifted to installations, videos, photographs, and objects. He works with materials such as plexiglass, wax, glass, and metal. His works often rely on the interplay between ghostly transparency and physical density contingent on the shadows thrown over the objects. Sound and text are also a key component of his art.

Stafanoff's artistic career also includes a fruitful cooperation with Nina Kovacheva, his spouse, especially with video and video installations in public and museum spaces. For the installation 'In the Out', at the 4th Biennial of Contemporary Art 2002 in Cetinje, Montenegro, NINA Kovacheva and Stefanoff were awarded the UNESCO annual prize for art.

Selected solo exhibitions
 2020 'Paradise is temporarily closed, God', Kultum, Graz, Austria
 2019 H2O / 2H2O, 359 Gallery, Sofia, Bulgaria
 2018 0 for Black 1 for White, Sofia City Art Gallery, Bulgaria 
 2018 , Sofia - Arsenal, Museum of Contemporary Art, Sofia, Bulgaria,
 2018 0 for Black 1 for White, Sofia City Art Gallery, Sofia, Bulgaria 
 2017 , National Gallery of Macedonia, Skopje, Macedonia
 2012 Physics and Metaphysics of the Dark Spot, Arosita Gallery, Sofia, Bulgaria,
 2010 Surplus Enjoyment, Museum of Contemporary Art Taipei, Taiwan
 2006 Play for Two Hands and Black, video installation on the facade of Academy of Fine Arts, Sofia, Bulgaria 
 2008 Au-delà de ce qui est visible, MNAC National Museum of Contemporary Art, Bucharest, Romania
 2005 Phases of Accumulation and Extraction in a Limited Space, National Art Gallery, Sofia, Bulgaria,
 2003 Currency, Galerie Mabelle Semler, Pars, France
 2000 Open-Close, Museum for Modern and Contemporary Art, Belgrade, Serbia 
 1998 Identifications of the Space II, Gallery Luc Queyrel, Paris, France
 1994 6 x 4 x 16, Galerie Bernard Jordan, Paris, France

Selected group exhibitions

Collections 
Stefanoff's works are included in the following permanent collections: Bibliothèque Nationale de France,  Victoria and Albert Museum, London, Albertina collection Vienna, Museum of Contemporary Art Taipei, Musée d'art moderne (Saint-Étienne) France, European Investment Bank Luxembourg, National Art Gallery, Bulgaria, The City Art Gallery-Sofia.

References

Bibliography 
 Surplus Enjoyment, 2015. .
 Valentin Stefanoff & NINA Kovacheva, ArtPress 309, Feb 2005 page 89
 Close Encounter Jeju mueum of Art publisher – Kim Tae-Eon (director, Jeju Museum of Art)  pages 153,154,156,157
 Art China, Vol 2 page 63 
 Central Europe Revisited III - Druckerei Bzoch – Austria pages 54,55
 Spectacle – to each his own Museum of Contemporary Art, Taipei  pages 112,113,114,115
 Mediation Biennale - Poligrafia'' Janusz Novwak   pages 206,207

External links
 
 Atelier le Grand Village

1959 births
Living people
Bulgarian artists
Interdisciplinary artists